Francis Annesley, 1st Earl Annesley (27 November 1740 – 19 December 1802) was an Anglo-Irish politician and peer.

He was the son of William Annesley, 1st Viscount Glerawly and Lady Anne Beresford, the daughter of Marcus Beresford, 1st Earl of Tyrone. He held the office of Member of Parliament for Downpatrick between 1761 and 1770. On 12 September 1770 he succeeded his father as Viscount Glerawly and assumed his seat in the Irish House of Lords. On 17 August 1789, Annesley was created Earl Annesley, of Castlewellan in the County of Down, in the Peerage of Ireland. The earldom was created with special remainder to his brother, Richard, as Annesley had no legitimate children.

References

1740 births
1802 deaths
18th-century Anglo-Irish people
Francis
Irish MPs 1761–1768
Irish MPs 1769–1776
Members of the Parliament of Ireland (pre-1801) for County Down constituencies
1